Herbert Allen Ardinger (25 April 1910 in Glassport, Pennsylvania – 14 June 1973 in Wayne, Michigan) was an American racecar driver.

Ardinger competed in eight AAA Championship Car races from 1934 to 1939, including the 1934, 1936, 1937, and 1938 Indianapolis 500 races (he failed to qualify in 1935 when driving a factory-supported Ford entered by Lew Welch). He finished sixth in the 1938 race in a front-drive Miller. In 1947 he returned to the Speedway to serve as a replacement driver for Doc Williams in the Novi and finished a career-best fourth.

Indy 500 results

References

1910 births
1973 deaths
Indianapolis 500 drivers
People from Glassport, Pennsylvania
Racing drivers from Pennsylvania
Racing drivers from Pittsburgh